The BMW M337 is a straight-6 OHV petrol engine installed at a slanted angle which was produced in three variants (M337/1, M337/2 and M337/3) from 1952-1958. Built to power BMW's first new car after World War II, the M337 engine was a replacement for the BMW M78.

Design 
Compared with its M78 predecessor, the M337 features a revised cylinder head, a new inlet manifold and a reinforced crankshaft with bigger, more modern bearings. As per the M78, the M337 has an iron engine block, an iron cylinder head and overhead valves with two valves per cylinder.

Versions

M337/1 

Applications:
 1952-1954 501

M337/2 
The compression ratio for this engine is 6.8:1.

Applications:
 1954-1955 501A
 1954-1955 501B

M337/3 
The compression ratio was also increased to 7.0:1. Despite these changesm the M337/3 produced no more power than the previous version.

Applications:
 1955-1958 501/3

References

BMW engines
Straight-six engines
Slant engines
Gasoline engines by model